Peter Glazebrook is a vegetable grower from Halam in Nottinghamshire.  He holds the world records for the longest beetroot and parsnip, and the heaviest onion, potato, and cauliflower. The world’s longest beetroot and parsnip measured 21 ft and 19 ft, 5in respectively; the world’s heaviest onion weighed 18 lb; potato, 11 lb; and the cauliflower, 60 lbs and 6 ft wide.

He also held the world record for the heaviest carrot, weighing in at 20 lbs. Glazebrook held this record from 2014, to September 2017.

References

External link
Photo on Flickr

World record holders
People from Newark and Sherwood (district)